Teun Tolman (22 September 1924, in Oldeholtpade – 30 October 2007, in Oldeholtpade) was a Dutch politician.

1924 births
2007 deaths
People from Weststellingwerf
Christian Historical Union politicians
Members of the House of Representatives (Netherlands)
Christian Historical Union MEPs
Christian Democratic Appeal MEPs
MEPs for the Netherlands 1958–1979
MEPs for the Netherlands 1979–1984
MEPs for the Netherlands 1984–1989